Bidrohi may refer to:

 "Bidrohi" (poem)
 Bidrohi (film)

See also 

 Bidrohini, 2020 Bangla film